Abune Phillipos (27 September 1901 – 18 September 2002) was the first Patriarch of the Eritrean Orthodox Tewahedo Church.

Life
He was born in Endadeko, Ighelehames, Akeleguzay, Eritrea and began his religious training at the Debre Bizen Monastery at the age of eleven, and took monastic and priestly vows there.  He was raised to the rank of Bishop and then Archbishop of the Ethiopian Orthodox Church at Addis Ababa, but then left that church to join the Eritrean Synod when the Eritrean Orthodox Tewahedo Church broke away from the Ethiopian church upon the independence of Eritrea.  He was elevated to the rank of Patriarch of Eritrea in May 1999 at the hands of Coptic Pope Shenouda III, and was enthroned in Asmara.  He joined Ethiopian Patriarch Paulos in an unsuccessful effort to mediate the war between Ethiopia and Eritrea.  Phillipos died after a long illness on September 18, 2002 at Asmara and was buried at the Debre Bizen Monastery.  He was succeeded by Yacob.

People from Southern Region (Eritrea)
Patriarchs of Eritrea
Eritrean Oriental Orthodox Christians
Eritrean centenarians
1901 births
2002 deaths
20th-century Oriental Orthodox archbishops
21st-century Oriental Orthodox archbishops
Men centenarians